"There for Awhile" is a song written by Curtis Wright and Anna Lisa Graham, and recorded by American country music artist Steve Wariner.  It was released in November 1990 as the third single from the album Laredo.  The song reached #17 on the Billboard Hot Country Singles & Tracks chart.

Chart performance

References

1990 singles
1990 songs
Steve Wariner songs
Songs written by Curtis Wright
Song recordings produced by Tony Brown (record producer)
MCA Records singles